This is a list of Spanish women's football transfers in the summer transfer window 2015 by club. Primera División clubs are listed according to the 2015–16 season table.

Primera División

In
 Source: Ligas Fútbol Femenino

 1 On loan
 2 Back from loan

Out
 Source: Liga Vasca Femenina

 1 On loan
 2 Back from loan

See also
 2015–16 Primera División (women)

External links
 DFB official Frauen Bundesliga website

Football transfers summer 2015
Trans
2015
Football